Scheibukta is a bay in Albert I Land at Spitsbergen, Svalbard. The bay is located on Reuschhalvøya, outside Scheibreen and west of St. Laurentiusbukta. It is named after Norwegian geologist Per Schei.

References

Bays of Spitsbergen